Roland Walter George Mills (22 June 1933 – 8 February 2010) was an English footballer who played as a wing half. He spent his entire career with Northampton Town, where he made 305 appearances. After retiring from playing he managed non-League club Long Buckby.

He was the father of Gary Mills, a player turned manager.

Death
Mills died on the morning of 8 February 2010 from Alzheimer's disease.

References

1933 births
2010 deaths
People from Daventry
English footballers
England youth international footballers
Association football midfielders
Northampton Town F.C. players
English Football League players
English football managers
Long Buckby A.F.C. managers
Deaths from dementia in the United Kingdom
Deaths from Alzheimer's disease